is a rural district located in Shizuoka Prefecture, Japan. As of July 2012, the district has an estimated population of 94,229 and a population density of 550 persons per km2. The total area was 171.4856 km2.

Towns and villages
Suntō District currently is composed of three towns. The cities of Susono and Gotemba and parts of the cities of Numazu and Fuji were formerly part of the district.

Oyama
Shimizu
Nagaizumi

History

Suntō District was established in the July 22, 1878 cadastral reforms initiated by the Meiji government with five towns, one post station and 155 villages.

 In a round of consolidation on April 1, 1889, this was reduced to three towns (Numazu, Hara and Gotemba) and 24 villages.
 Oyama Village was established as Oyama Town on August 1, 1912.
 Numazu Town was elevated to city status on July 1, 1923.
 Susono Town was established on April 1, 1952.
 In an around of consolidation from 1955 to 1957, Gotemba was elevated to city status on February 11, 1955. The remaining number of villages reduced to two.
 Nagaizumi Village was promoted to town status on April 1, 1960.
 Shimizu Village was promoted to town status on November 3, 1963, leaving the district with five towns and no villages.
 Hara Town was annexed by Numazu on April 1, 1968.
 Susono Town was elevated to city status on January 1, 1971.

 

Districts in Shizuoka Prefecture